The 1990 Daily Mirror/Sporting Life Greyhound Derby took place in May and June with the final being held on 30 June 1990 at Wimbledon Stadium.  The winner was Slippy Blue and the winning owner Mrs Eileen Fenn received £40,000. The competition was sponsored by the Sporting Life and Daily Mirror. 
 Slippy Blue was bred by William McAllister from Scotland.

Final result 
At Wimbledon  (over 480 metres):

Distances 
3¼, head, ¾, 13½, neck (lengths)
The distances between the greyhounds are in finishing order and shown in lengths. One length is equal to 0.08 of one second.

Competition Report
The leading contender for the 1990 Derby was Druids Johno half owned by Prince Edward. The half share of the black dog had been given to the prince by Patsy Byrne during a charity meeting at Canterbury; all prize money would go to the Royal Marines Benevolent Fund.

John McGee's main hope Aghadown Timmy set the fastest qualifying heat win in 28.56 sec whilst Ger McKenna had two first round winners in Itsallovernow and Beau Ami. Lyons Dean set the fastest first round time with a 28.70 and Druids Johno made it two from two.
 
During the second round the ante-post favourite Aghadown Timmy went out after finishing lame whilst Westmead Lodge from the Savva kennels recorded a speedy 28.77. Fires of War trained by Tony Meek lit up the third round with a fast 28.67 only to be bettered one heat later by Druids Johno in 28.66. McGee's bad luck continued when his Irish Greyhound Derby and Laurels finalist Yes Speedy was eliminated after trouble.

The quarter-finals started badly as Westmead Lodge was knocked over; this was followed by Druids Johno catching Slippy Blue to win heat two with Shanavulin Bingo and Slippys Quest taking the remaining quarter-finals. Prince Edward watched Druids Johno win his semifinal at odds on from outsiders Burnt Oak Champ and Slippy Blue before the second decider ended with Galtymore Lad beating Fires of War and Fair Hill Boy.

Patsy Byrne now a trainer in his own right after having previous finalists Easy Prince and Stouke Whisper as an owner had brought Irishman Pa Fitzgerald to run his kennel and the pair trained Druids Johno, the odds on favourite for the Derby final. As the traps rose Slippy Blue trained by Kenny Linzell and owned by Eileen Fenn went into an early lead and maintained it to the finish. The blue dog had been backed ante post at 100-1 and 20-1 on course during the first show of the final. Druids Johno finished runner-up.

Quarter-finals

Semifinals

See also
1990 UK & Ireland Greyhound Racing Year

References

Greyhound Derby
English Greyhound Derby
June 1990 sports events in Europe